Paul Chen (born July 25, 1998), known professionally as Paolo Gumabao, is a Filipino actor and model.

Personal life 
Gumabao was born in Taiwan. His biological father is actor Dennis Roldan. Through his father, he is a half-sibling to Marco Gumabao and Michele Gumabao. Actress Isabel Rivas is his aunt.

Filmography

Television

Film

Awards and nominations

Notes

References

External links
 

Living people
21st-century Filipino male actors
Filipino male film actors
Filipino male television actors
1998 births